Étienne Laurent Pierre Burnel (22 May 1762 in Rennes – 12 July 1835 in Rennes) was a French colonial administrator.

Life
Born into a middle-class family, Burnel studied at the Jesuit college in Rennes - his father Pierre-Étienne Burnel was a magistrate who spent much of his career in Guyana. Aged 18, Burnel joined the régiment de Béarn, in which he spent several years under the command of the chevalier de Payan, working as his secretary.

On 16 November 1790, he moved to île de France to seek his fortune. On 1 January 1791 he founded the Le Journal politique et littéraire, editing it for 18 months. At the end of 1791, one year after arriving, he joined the bar at  Port-Louis. Becoming a public personality and general correspondent and 'avocat d'affaires' to the colonial assembly at Pondicherry, he then became a member of the local directory in 1794.

In March 1794, he chartered a ship under an American flag on a commercial operation and sailed on her himself. Despite the USA still being neutral in the French Revolutionary Wars, it was captured by the British and declared a legitimate prize, ruining Burnel. Dropped off at an American port, he took the chance to visit Boston, New York City, Philadelphia, Baltimore and Alexandria, meeting several French émigrés, including Talleyrand. It was in New York that Burnel learned of 9 Thermidor.

Back in France, in 1795 the French Directory put Burnel in command of a mission to Belgium. In 1796 he and René Gaston Baco de La Chapelle were sent to the îles de France and La Réunion as government agents charged with abolishing slavery. Arriving at Port-Louis on 18 June 1796, they were both expelled by the colonists, who had decided to resist the abolition.

In 1798, the government sent him to Guyana to replace Nicolas Georges Jeannet-Oudin, nephew of Danton. Signed by the minister for the navy Bruix, his orders gave him wide autonomy. Arriving at Cayenne in October, he had to face the landowners' hostility to the central government and to the large number of men deported, victims of the Thermidorian reaction (Billaud-Varenne) and the coup of 18 Fructidor (general Pichegru, Tronsson-Ducoudray, Laffon-Ladebat, Barbé-Marbois and Job Aymé). Barbé-Marbois attacked him in letters to his close friends in France, published 36 years later under the title Journal d'un déporté.

After 18 months as governor, he successfully requested a recall to France on health grounds. Arriving back in France after Napoleon's coup of 18 brumaire, he retired to private life. When Napoleon set up prefectures in 1800, some friends wished to put Burnel's name forward, but Burnel remained faithful to the Republic and opposed them. It was only during the French military disasters of 1812 and 1813 that he offered his services to Napoleon. He was rewarded with a pension of 6,000 francs. Denounced as a "former terrorist", a "septembriseur" and secretary to "Robespierre", he was convoked by the marquis de Vioménil, commander of the 13th military division, to whom he could demonstrate that the accusations were unfounded. He saw the ant de la 13th division militaire, auquel il n'a aucun mal à démontrer l'inanité de ces accusations. He lived to see the July Revolution of 1830, before dying in Rennes in 1835.

Bibliography
Prosper Jean Levot, Biographie bretonne, vol. I, Cauderan, 1852, « Burnel (Étienne-Laurent-Pierre) », p. 213-217.
Claude Wanquet, La France et la première abolition de l'esclavage: 1794-1802, Karthala Éditions, 1998, 724 p. [lire en ligne], « L'équipée de Baco et Burnel », p. 293-296.

1762 births
1835 deaths
French politicians